Hope is an EP by Palace Songs. It was released in 1994 through Drag City Records. The title "Agnes, Queen of Sorrow" is a reference to the short story "Jane Sinclair; or, the Fawn of Springvale" by 19th century author William Carleton.

Critical reception
AllMusic wrote that "given a rich, reliable musical backing on Hope, Oldham is free to wander without hindering the songs." Trouser Press wrote that "the fuller tone of these songs, colored to a great degree by Liam Hayes’ Hammond organ, is reminiscent of Dylan’s initial Nashville forays — particularly the hypnotic 'Agnes, Queen of Sorrow.'" The Spin Alternative Record Guide wrote that Oldham "hones the edge between uncertainty and beauty."

Track listing
"Agnes, Queen of Sorrow" – 4:05
"Untitled" – 2:23
"Winter Lady" (Leonard Cohen) – 2:42
"Christmastime in the Mountains" – 1:38
"All Gone, All Gone" – 4:52
"Werner's Last Blues to Blokbuster" – 4:41

Personnel
Push (Will Oldham) – vocals, guitar, bass
Liam Hayes – piano, organ, electric guitar
Rian Murphy – drums, harmonies
Sean O'Hagan – piano, harmonies
Rob Allum – drums
Briana Corrigan – harmonies

References

1994 EPs
Will Oldham albums
Drag City (record label) EPs
Domino Recording Company EPs